The Asian Women's Youth Handball Championship is the official competition for youth women's national handball teams of Asia, organised under the aegis of Asian Handball Federation. It takes place every two years. In addition to crowning the Asian champions, the tournament also serves as a qualifying tournament for the Women's Youth World Handball Championship.

Summary

Medal table

Participating nations

See also
Asian Women's Handball Championship
Asian Women's Junior Handball Championship
Asian Men's Handball Championship
 Asian Men's Junior Handball Championship
 Asian Men's Youth Handball Championship

References

External links
 Results
 Asian Handball Federation

Asian Handball Championships
Youth handball
Women's handball competitions
Women's sports competitions in Asia
Youth sport in Asia